Niobium nitride is a compound of niobium and nitrogen (nitride) with the chemical formula NbN. At low temperatures (about 16 K) NbN becomes a superconductor, and is used in detectors for infrared light.

Uses
Niobium nitride's main use is as a superconductor. 
Detectors based on it can detect a single photon in the 1-10 micrometer section of the infrared spectrum, which is important for astronomy and telecommunications. It can detect changes up to 25 gigahertz. 
Superconducting NbN nanowires can be used in particle detectors with high magnetic fields.
Niobium nitride is also used in absorbing anti-reflective coatings.
In 2015, it was reported that Panasonic Corp. has developed a photocatalyst based on niobium nitride that can absorb 57% of sunlight to support the decomposition of water to produce hydrogen gas as fuel for electrochemical fuel cells.

References

Niobium(III) compounds
Nitrides
Superconductors
Rock salt crystal structure